Piedras River (Río Piedras) is a river in Guanacaste Province of Costa Rica. It rises in the Cordillera de Guanacaste and flows southward through Hacienda Tamarindo and joins Bebedero River near the town of Bebedero.

References

Rivers of Costa Rica